The People's Parliaments or People's Assemblies were puppet legislatures put together after the show elections in Estonia, Latvia, and Lithuania to legitimize the occupation by the Soviet Union in July 1940. In all three countries, the elections to the parliaments followed the same script, dictated by functionaries in Moscow and borrowed from the examples of the incorporation of the Belarusian and Ukrainian lands into Soviet Union in the aftermath of the invasion of Poland in 1939.

Occupation

On June 15 and 16, 1940, the Soviet Union presented ultimatums to all three Baltic states, which were then invaded by the Red Army. After the invasions, the previous governments of the Baltic states were replaced by pro-Communist "People's Governments". The new governments then dismissed the existing parliaments (Riigikogu in Estonia, Seimas in Lithuania) and announced new elections to the "People's Parliaments" to be held on July 14 and 15, 1940 (originally, the election in Lithuania was to be held only on July 14, but due to low turnout was also extended to July 15).

Elections

Only candidates proposed by legally functioning institutions could run in each election. By that time all non-communist parties and organizations were outlawed. The local Communist parties emerged from underground with 1,500 members in Lithuania, 500 in Latvia, and 133 in Estonia. Therefore only the Working People's Leagues proposed candidates, exactly one per each available seat. There were a number of non-communists on its slate. Efforts to present alternative candidates were blocked. Repressions and terror were employed against election critics and political activists. For example, in Lithuania some 2,000 activists were arrested on June 11. People were coerced to vote – those who voted had their passports stamped while anyone who did not vote was dubbed an "enemy of the people" and could expect future persecutions for "failing their political duties". The ballots had only one option – the name chosen by the Communists. According to the rigged results, Communist candidates received over 90% of the vote. The Soviet envoy in London released election results even before the voting booths closed.

Parliament sessions and aftermath
All three parliaments convened on July 21, 1940. In their first sessions all three parliaments unanimously adopted resolutions to convert their states to Soviet Socialist Republics (SSR): the Estonian SSR, Latvian SSR, and Lithuanian SSR. Another decree resolved to petition the Supreme Soviet of the Soviet Union to accept these newly established SSRs into the Soviet Union. The parliaments also elected their representatives to go to Moscow and personally present their case in front of the Supreme Soviet. Other acts adopted in these early sessions concerned nationalization of virtually all larger enterprises, real estate, and land, and other Sovietization policies. The laws were adopted unanimously, with virtually no discussion.

On August 1, the Baltic delegates arrived to Moscow and petitioned the Supreme Soviet. After apparent deliberation, the Lithuanian request was granted on August 3, the Latvian request on August 5, and the Estonian request on August 6. As a result the People's Parliaments renamed themselves Supreme Soviets of the respective SSRs. Thus the process of legitimizing the occupation was complete. Even after the dissolution of the Soviet Union, Russia officially maintains that all three Baltic states voluntarily joined the Union.

See also
 People's Seimas, the parliament in Soviet-occupied Lithuania
 , the parliament in Soviet-occupied Latvia

References

1940 in Lithuania
1940 in Latvia
1940 in Estonia
1940 in the Soviet Union
Historical legislatures
Government of the Soviet Union